Peter King (born June 10, 1957) is an American sportswriter. He wrote for Sports Illustrated from 1989 to 2018, including the weekly multiple-page column Monday Morning Quarterback. He is the author of five books, including Inside the Helmet. He has been named National Sportswriter of the Year three times.

Before coming to Sports Illustrated, King was a writer for The Cincinnati Enquirer from 1980 to 1985 and Newsday from 1985 to 1989.

Since 1992 King has been a member of the Board of Selectors for the Pro Football Hall of Fame. In 2006, he joined Football Night in America, NBC Sports' Sunday night NFL studio show.

In May 2018, King announced that he would be ending his 29-year tenure at Sports Illustrated to work for NBC Sports full-time. He continues to publish his long-read column, now titled Football Morning in America and appearing on ProFootballTalk.

Television
King joined the HBO show Inside the NFL in 2002 as a managing editor and reporter. With the return of NFL programming to NBC for the 2006 season, NBC started a studio show called Football Night in America, set between the end of the Sunday afternoon games, and the primetime Sunday Night Football. King joined the lineup of Bob Costas, Cris Collinsworth, Sterling Sharpe and Jerome Bettis, serving as a special "insider" reporter and analyst for the show, highlighting major topics from that day.

Radio
From the 2008 offseason until the fall of 2011, King co-hosted The Opening Drive on Sirius NFL Radio with Randy Cross and Bob Papa. He has been a regular contributor to Chris Russo's Sirius XM show, Mad Dog Unleashed, since 2008. King is also a frequent guest on The Dan Patrick Show and ESPN's Golic and Wingo.

Once a week during football season, he joins the Musers on Dallas's KTCK-AM/KTCK-FM for a segment.

Other work
In 2005 the governor of New Jersey appointed King to a fact-finding task force in an attempt to end steroid and human growth hormone use in high-school athletics.

King is the author of five books on football: Inside the Helmet (1993), Football: A History of the Professional Game (1993), Football (1997), Greatest Quarterbacks (1999) and Sports Illustrated Monday Morning Quarterback: A fully caffeinated guide to everything you need to know about the NFL (2009).

In 2009, he was awarded the Dick McCann Memorial Award for his work in professional football.

Personal life
King graduated from Enfield High School in Enfield, Connecticut in 1975. He was a three sports star at Enfield playing soccer, basketball and baseball.  He then got his degree from Ohio University's E. W. Scripps School of Journalism. He lives in Brooklyn NY, with his wife Ann, who is a native of the Pittsburgh area. They have two daughters; Laura and Mary Beth, one of whom is a Pittsburgh Steelers fan.

In 1997 King was inducted into the Enfield Athletic Hall of Fame.

References

External links
Peter King archive

Inside the Helmet 
King's twitter page
King's old SI twitter page

Ohio University alumni
1957 births
Living people
American television reporters and correspondents
Dick McCann Memorial Award recipients
National Football League announcers
People from Montclair, New Jersey
Writers from Springfield, Massachusetts
The Cincinnati Enquirer people
Sportswriters from Massachusetts